is a former Japanese football player. She played for Japan national team.

Club career
Otani was born in Koka on May 5, 1979. After graduating from high school, she joined Tasaki Perule FC in 1998. She became top scorer for 3 years in a row (2001 and 2003). In 2003 season, she was also selected MVP awards and the club won L.League championship. In 2005 season, she became top scorer again. However, the club was disbanded in 2008 due to financial strain. So, she retired end of 2008 season. She scored 150 goals in 180 matches in L.League. She was also selected Best Eleven for 3 years in a row (2001-2006).

National team career
On May 31, 2000, Otani debuted for Japan national team against Australia. She was a member of Japan for 2003, 2007 World Cup and 2004 Summer Olympics. She scored a hat trick in Japan's victory over Argentina in the 2003 World Cup. She also played at 2001, 2003 AFC Championship, 2002 Asian Games and 2006 Asian Cup. She played 73 games and scored 31 goals for Japan until 2007.

National team statistics

International goals

References

External links

1979 births
Living people
Association football people from Shiga Prefecture
Japanese women's footballers
Japan women's international footballers
Nadeshiko League players
Tasaki Perule FC players
Asian Games medalists in football
Footballers at the 2002 Asian Games
2003 FIFA Women's World Cup players
2007 FIFA Women's World Cup players
Olympic footballers of Japan
Footballers at the 2004 Summer Olympics
Asian Games bronze medalists for Japan
Women's association football forwards
Medalists at the 2002 Asian Games
Nadeshiko League MVPs